Alexander Wright VC (1826 – 28 July 1858) was a British Army soldier and an Irish recipient of the Victoria Cross, the highest award for gallantry in the face of the enemy that can be awarded to British and Commonwealth forces.

Background

Alexander Wright was born in Ballymena, in what is now Northern Ireland.

Details
He was about 29 years old, and a private in the 77th (East Middlesex) Regiment of Foot (later The Middlesex Regiment (Duke of Cambridge's Own)), British Army during the Crimean War when the following deed took place for which he was awarded the VC.

On 22 March 1855 at the Siege of Sebastopol, in the Crimean Peninsula, Private Wright distinguished himself in repelling a sortie. On 19 April he showed great bravery at the taking of the Russian Rifle Pits and was particularly noticed for the encouragement he gave the other men while holding the Pits under very heavy fire; he was wounded in this action. He again showed great courage on 30 August 1855, and throughout the war.

It is unclear whether Wright ever received his medal, as his regiment had deployed to help quell the Indian Rebellion of 1857. He was killed in action on 28 July 1858 during intense fighting in Calcutta. His body was not recovered and he has no known grave.

His Victoria Cross is displayed at the Princess of Wales's Royal Regiment (Queen's and Royal Hampshires) Museum in Dover Castle, England.

References

Sources
 Profile
The Register of the Victoria Cross (1981, 1988 and 1997)

Ireland's VCs  (Dept of Economic Development, 1995)
Monuments to Courage (David Harvey, 1999)
Irish Winners of the Victoria Cross (Richard Doherty & David Truesdale, 2000)

1826 births
1858 deaths
19th-century Irish people
Irish soldiers in the British Army
People from Ballymena
People from County Antrim
Middlesex Regiment soldiers
Irish recipients of the Victoria Cross
Crimean War recipients of the Victoria Cross
Military personnel from County Antrim
British Army personnel of the Crimean War
British military personnel of the Indian Rebellion of 1857
British Army recipients of the Victoria Cross
British military personnel killed in the Indian Rebellion of 1857